William Ettrick (1651 – 5 December 1716) was an English politician who represented the constituencies of Poole and Christchurch in the House of Commons of England.

He was a Member of Parliament at the time of the Acts of Union 1707 and sat in the First Parliament of Great Britain.

Life 
He sat in both the House of Commons of England and the House of Commons of Great Britain.

Family 
He was the son of MP Anthony Ettrick.

References 

1651 births
1716 deaths
Alumni of Trinity College, Oxford
People from Poole
People from Christchurch, Dorset
Members of the Parliament of Great Britain for English constituencies
English MPs 1685–1687
English MPs 1689–1690
English MPs 1690–1695
English MPs 1695–1698
English MPs 1698–1700
English MPs 1701
English MPs 1701–1702
English MPs 1702–1705
English MPs 1705–1707
British MPs 1707–1708
British MPs 1708–1710
British MPs 1710–1713
British MPs 1713–1715
British MPs 1715–1722
Tory members of the Parliament of Great Britain